Syzemology is the debut album by underground rapper and Army of the Pharaohs member King Syze. It was released on May 30, 2006.

Background
The album features appearances from fellow Army of the Pharaohs members Vinnie Paz, 7L & Esoteric, OuterSpace, Reef the Lost Cauze, Des Devious & Block McCloud as well as verses from Sabac Red (formerly of Non Phixion) & Pumpkinhead. It also features production from 7L, Arythmetic, Block McCloud, Cimer, Jon Doe, Joshue "AK" I. Cortes, November 17, Showgun, Sound Scientist, Undefined.

Track listing

References

2006 albums
Babygrande Records albums
King Syze albums